Issac is a commune in the Dordogne department in Nouvelle-Aquitaine in southwestern France.

Population

Sights
The Château de Montréal, built in the 12th and 16th centuries.

See also
Communes of the Dordogne department

References

Communes of Dordogne